Armand Daigle (16 May 1892 – 8 March 1957) was a Canadian Liberal party member of the Senate of Canada. He was born in Saint-Roch, Quebec and became a businessman.

The son of Théodore Daigle and Célina Collette, he was educated in Sorel. In 1915, he married Élizabeth Brault. Daigle was a director of a number of companies, including Sun Trust Ltd., Montreal Life Insurance Company, Windsor Hotel Ltd. and RCA Victor Company Ltd.

He was appointed to the Senate by Prime Minister William Lyon Mackenzie King on 3 March 1944 for the Mille Isles, Quebec division. He remained in that role until his death on 8 March 1957.

References

External links
 

1892 births
1957 deaths
Businesspeople from Quebec
Canadian senators from Quebec
Liberal Party of Canada senators
Politicians from Quebec City